Juan Brunetta may refer to:

 Juan Guillermo Brunetta (born 1975), Argentine cyclist
 Juan Brunetta (footballer) (born 1997), Argentine footballer